Henri Anier (born 17 December 1990) is an Estonian professional footballer who plays as a striker for Thai League 1 club Muangthong United and the Estonia national team.

Club career

Flora
Anier came through the Flora youth system. He moved to Esiliiga club Warrior on loan for the 2007 season, and scored 13 goals in 24 league appearances. In January 2008, Anier was promoted to Flora's first team. He made his debut in the Meistriliiga on 8 March 2008, in a 1–1 home draw against Nõmme Kalju. On 29 March 2008, aged 17 years 103 days,
Anier became Flora's youngest ever goalscorer in the Meistriliiga when he scored in a 3–0 away win over Tallinna Kalev.

In August 2009, Anier joined Italian club Sampdoria on a season-long loan, where he played for the club's Primavera side.

Anier returned to Flora in July 2010. He scored 13 goals in 16 appearances and won his first Meistriliiga title in the 2010 season. He won his second Meistriliiga title in the 2011 season, and was Flora's top goalscorer with 21 goals.

Viking
On 20 December 2011, Anier signed a three-year contract with Norwegian Tippeligaen club Viking. He made his debut in the Tippeligaen on 26 March 2012, in a 2–2 away draw against Sandnes Ulf.

Fredrikstad (loan)
On 4 April 2013, Anier joined Adeccoligaen club Fredrikstad on loan until 15 July.

Motherwell
On 29 July 2013, Anier joined Scottish Premiership club Motherwell on an initial six-month loan, after being recommended by his Estonian teammate Henrik Ojamaa, who left the club the previous month. He made his first official appearance for Motherwell on 1 August 2013, in a 2–0 loss to Kuban Krasnodar in the first leg of the UEFA Europa League third qualifying round. Anier made his debut in the Scottish Premiership on 4 August 2013, coming on as a substitute for Robert McHugh in the 69th minute and scoring the only goal of an away win over Hibernian. On 10 January 2014, Anier signed for Motherwell permanently on a two-and-a-half-year contract. He ended the 2013–14 season with 9 goals in 37 appearances in all competitions for the Steelmen.

Erzgebirge Aue
On 19 June 2014, Anier and his brother Hannes signed three-year contracts with German 2. Bundesliga side Erzgebirge Aue. He made his debut for the club on 9 August 2014, in a 5–1 home loss to VfL Bochum. Anier made eight appearances for Erzgebirge Aue, but struggled to break into the first team under new manager Tomislav Stipić.

Dundee United
On 15 January 2015, Anier returned to the Scottish Premiership, signing a two-and-a-half-year contract with Dundee United. He made his debut for the club on 21 January 2015, in a 1–1 away draw against St Mirren.

Dundee United were relegated from the Scottish Premiership in the 2015–16 season. On 8 August 2016, Anier left Dundee United after his contract was cancelled by mutual consent.

Hibernian (loan)
On 1 September 2015, Anier joined Scottish Championship side Hibernian on a season-long loan. However, on 14 January 2016, he was recalled by relegation-threatened Dundee United.

Kalmar FF
On 10 August 2016, Anier signed for Swedish Allsvenskan club Kalmar FF until the end of the 2016 season. He made his debut in the Allsvenskan on 14 August 2016, in a 1–1 home draw against Malmö FF. On 17 September 2016, Anier scored his first goal for the club in a 2–0 home win over Östersunds FK.

Inverness Caledonian Thistle
On 16 January 2017, Anier returned to Scottish football, signing for Inverness Caledonian Thistle until the end of the 2016–17 season. He made his debut for the club on 21 January, in a 2–1 away victory over Elgin City in the fourth round of the Scottish Cup.

FC Lahti
On 10 July 2017, Anier signed a one-and-a-half-year contract with Veikkausliiga club FC Lahti.

Suwon FC
On 1 February 2019, South Korean club Suwon FC announced the signing of Anier.

International career
Anier began his youth career in 2006 with the Estonia under-17 team. He also represented the under-19, under-21, and under-23 national sides.

On 25 May 2011, Anier made an unofficial senior debut for Estonia, in a 2–1 home loss to Basque Country in a non-FIFA match. On 10 June 2011, he was named by manager Tarmo Rüütli in the Estonia squad to face Chile and Uruguay in friendly matches. Anier made his senior international debut in a 4–0 loss to Chile on 19 June 2011. He scored his first international goal on 8 November 2012, in a 2–1 away win over Oman in a friendly.

Personal life
Anier's younger brother Hannes is also a professional footballer.

Career statistics

Club

International

Scores and results list Estonia's goal tally first, score column indicates score after each Anier goal.

Honours
Flora
Meistriliiga: 2010, 2011
Estonian Cup: 2007–08, 2008–09, 2010–11
Estonian Supercup: 2009, 2011

References

External links

1990 births
Living people
Footballers from Tallinn
Estonian footballers
Association football forwards
FC Warrior Valga players
FC Flora players
Viking FK players
Fredrikstad FK players
Motherwell F.C. players
Dundee United F.C. players
Hibernian F.C. players
Inverness Caledonian Thistle F.C. players
FC Erzgebirge Aue players
Kalmar FF players
FC Lahti players
U.C. Sampdoria players
Suwon FC players
Go Ahead Eagles players
Paide Linnameeskond players
Esiliiga players
Meistriliiga players
Eliteserien players
Norwegian First Division players
2. Bundesliga players
Allsvenskan players
K League 2 players
Veikkausliiga players
Scottish Professional Football League players
Estonia youth international footballers
Estonia under-21 international footballers
Estonia international footballers
Estonian expatriate footballers
Expatriate footballers in Italy
Estonian expatriate sportspeople in Italy
Expatriate footballers in Norway
Estonian expatriate sportspeople in Norway
Expatriate footballers in Scotland
Estonian expatriate sportspeople in Scotland
Expatriate footballers in Germany
Estonian expatriate sportspeople in Germany
Estonian expatriate sportspeople in Sweden
Expatriate footballers in Sweden
Estonian expatriate sportspeople in Finland
Expatriate footballers in Finland
Expatriate footballers in South Korea
Estonian expatriate sportspeople in South Korea
Expatriate footballers in the Netherlands
Estonian expatriate sportspeople in the Netherlands
Expatriate footballers in Thailand
Estonian expatriate sportspeople in Thailand
Henri Anier